The Chipola River is a tributary of the Apalachicola River in western Florida. It is part of the ACF River Basin watershed.

The  river crosses present-day Jackson, Calhoun and Gulf counties.

The river flows through what is now preserved as the Dead Lakes State Recreation Area just before reaching its mouth at the confluence with the Apalachicola. The Dead Lakes were formed when the Apalachicola deposited sand bars blocking the mouth of the Chipola.

The Chipola River flows for several miles south from the Dead Lakes, parallel to the Apalachicola River, before reaching its confluence with the larger river.

See also
Look and Tremble
Outstanding Florida Waters

References 

 Marth, Del and Marty Marth, eds. The Rivers of Florida. Sarasota, Florida: Pineapple Press, Inc. . P. 95.

External links

Rivers of Florida
1Chipola
Bodies of water of Calhoun County, Florida
Bodies of water of Gulf County, Florida
Bodies of water of Jackson County, Florida
Outstanding Florida Waters